The Revenue Act can refer to a number of tax-related laws:

British Empire
Revenue Act of 1764, popularly known as the Sugar Act
Revenue Act of 1766
Revenue Act of 1767 (7 Geo. III c. 46), one of the Townshend Acts

United States
 Revenue Act of 1861
 Revenue Act of 1862
 Revenue Act of 1894, known as the Wilson–Gorman Tariff Act
 War Revenue Act of 1898
 Revenue Act of 1913
 Revenue Act of 1916
 War Revenue Act of 1917
 Revenue Act of 1918
 Revenue Act of 1921
 Revenue Act of 1924
 Revenue Act of 1926
 Revenue Act of 1928
 Revenue Act of 1932
 Revenue Act of 1934
 Revenue Act of 1935
 Revenue Act of 1936
 Revenue Act of 1940
 Revenue Act of 1941
 Revenue Act of 1942
 Revenue Act of 1943
 Revenue Act of 1945
 Revenue Act of 1948
 Revenue Act of 1950
 Revenue Act of 1951
 Revenue Act of 1962
 Revenue Act of 1964
 Tax Reform Act of 1969
 Revenue Act of 1978

United States federal taxation legislation